Haynes Mountain is a mountain located in the Catskill Mountains of New York south-southwest of Pine Hill. Haynes Mountain is located south of Belle Ayr Mountain, south-southeast of Hirams Knob, and north of Eagle Mountain.

References

Mountains of Ulster County, New York
Mountains of New York (state)